Świerczynek is a village in the administrative district of Gmina Topólka, within Radziejów County, Kuyavian-Pomeranian Voivodeship, in north-central Poland. The family of John Krasinski, an actor and filmmaker of Polish origin, comes from Świerczynek.

References

Villages in Radziejów County